Protocaris marshi is an extinct species of bivalved arthropod known from a single specimen collected from the Cambrian Series 2 aged Parker Formation from the Parker Quarry of northwestern Vermont, United States The specimen is preserved in top-down view and has a bivalved carapace, a segmented trunk and a forked tail. Its precise taxonomic position is uncertain, due to the limited nature of known remains, but it is suggested to be a member of Hymenocarina belonging to the family Protocarididae, which also includes Tokummia and Branchiocaris.

References

Cambrian arthropods

Hymenocarina